Kip Tyler (May 31, 1929 – September 23, 1996) was an American singer and bongo player.

Early life
Elwood Westertson Smith was born in Chicago, Illinois.

Career
Lead singer of Sleepwalkers during his time at Union High School and later teamed up with rival musicians from Fairfax High School to form the early version of Kip Tyler and the Flips. In early 1957, Kip caught the attention of arranger Joseph Gershenson who hired him to work on a project connected to the movie "Rock, Pretty Baby". Stemming from the success of movie, Tyler took on the name of Jimmy Daley (the main character of the movie who he provided a voice over for) and formed the band Jimmy Daley And The Ding-A-Lings. He recorded his first album at Decca Records. Songs such as "Red Lips and Green Eyes", "Bongo Rock" and "Hole in the Wall" were produced at Decca Records. Unfortunately for Tyler, the sequel to "Rock, Pretty Baby", "Summer Love" was a flop and so was the career of his surname, Jimmy Daley.

In late 1957, he formed a new group, Kip Tyler And The Flips, responsible for the hits "Let's Monkey Around", "Jungle Hop" and "She's My Witch". When the band split in 1959, Tyler attempted a solo career, but with limited success. In 1964 he recorded for the label Gyro Disk, and his success briefly peaked after recording a number of songs. Tyler's last single was made in 1965.

Music

(1) Jimmy Daley & The Ding-A-Lings (Feat. Kip Tyler)

(2) Kip Tyler & The Flips

(3) The Kipsters

(4) Kipper & The Exciters

(5) Kip Tyler & The White Fronts

(6) Kip Tyler & The Break-Outs

Death
He died on September 23, 1996 Los Angeles, California from natural causes.

References

1929 births
1996 deaths
American rockabilly musicians
Bongo players
20th-century American singers